MedAssets, Inc. was an American healthcare performance improvement company. It provided products and services to 4,400 hospitals and 122,000 non-acute healthcare providers.

The Alpharetta, Georgia based company had 15 offices across the United States. States with a MedAssets location included California, Colorado, Georgia, New Jersey, Texas, and Washington.

In early 2016, MedAssets was split into two companies and was sold out. The company no longer exists in its original form, although some of its products exist under other brand names under various companies including nThrive.

History
John Bardis founded MedAssets in June, 1999. The company began as a group purchasing organization (GPO) which offered its customers medical supply discounts. By August 2014, MedAssets had become the largest GPO in the United States. The company became publicly traded in 2007. MedAssets expanded its services over time and offerings included cost and clinical resource management, purchasing and revenue cycle solutions, change management consulting, and data-driven analytic software.

Acquisitions
In 1999, MedAssets acquired the GPO InSource Health Services of Los Angeles, California (see 2001 acquisition note for reference)
In 2007, MedAssets acquired Xactimed
In 2008, MedAssets acquired Accuro Healthcare Solutions
In 2010, MedAssets acquired rival Broadlane
In 2014, MedAssets acquired Sg2

References

Software companies based in Georgia (U.S. state)
Health care software
Defunct software companies of the United States
1999 establishments in the United States
1999 establishments in Georgia (U.S. state)
Software companies established in 1999
Companies established in 1999